Serafino Murri (born 5 April 1966) is an Italian film critic, screenwriter, and film director from Rome.

Career

Early career

After graduating in aesthetics from Sapienza University of Rome in 1990, Murri began writing screen dialogues for foreign film dubbing into Italian. He also became a dramaturg at the Rome-based theatre company I Costruttori. In 1996, he started work as a screenwriter with Italian film directors such as Volfango De Biasi and Mario Monicelli, and in the same year, he helped launch the Italian cinema quarterly Close-Up as well as becoming its editor-in-chief, a position he held until 1999. He was also instrumental in the creation of the cinema monthly Filmmaker's Magazine, and was its editor-in-chief from 1998 until 2000.

Film criticism and writing

Murri's main credits as film critic are studies and books on the work of Pier Paolo Pasolini, Krzysztof Kieslowski, Martin Scorsese, Orson Welles (also translating into Italian Welles' book Interviews in 2005), as well as essays on cinema.

Murri was a member of the selection committee of the Venice Film Festival in 2002 and 2003, and in 2008 and 2009, he managed the "Factual" section of the Roma Fiction Fest. From 2005 to 2013, he was film critic of the monthly magazine La Repubblica XL.

From 1999 to 2006, Murri collaborated with the satellite TV network RaiSat Cinema World as author, director, and studio host for television programs. Since 2012, he is the author of TV magazines for the DTV channel RaiMovie.

Murri has authored the works Encyclopaedia of Cinema (2004) and Lexicon of Contemporaneity (2013), published by Treccani.

Directing

Murri's debut in filmmaking is the 2004 feature-length production Movimenti, written and directed with Claudio Fausti. He followed this with several more projects, including the 2005 short The Changing of the Guard, produced and broadcast by Sky Channel. In 2009, he wrote the segments "Angelo Azzurro Reloaded" and "The Addiction" from the anthology film Feisbum - Il film.
He has also made documentary films, including The Music Hall of Rome in 2007 and Scandalo in sala. La sfida tra Potere e Cinema in Italia in 2014 (co-directed with Alexandra Rosati).

Teaching

Since 1999, Murri has taught cinema, art, and communication subjects ("Visual Communication", "Scriptwriting", "Phenomenology of Contemporary Arts") at Istituto Europeo di Design (IED) in Rome. From 2005 to 2011, he was professor of "Audiovisual and Media Translation" at IULM University of Milan, and he teaches "New Media and Cinema" at the Cinematographic Art School Gian Maria Volontè in Rome. He has been at the International University of Rome since 2018.

Memberships and posts
 From 2006 to 2009, Murri was on the board of directors of Amministrazione di Filmitalia S.p.a., associated with the film studio Cinecittà.
 From 2007 to 2011, he was a member of the Italian Society of Authors and Publishers.
 Since 2014, he has been working with Mario Amura at Emoticron s.r.l., an innovative startup founded in November 2014 in Naples. The organization has developed a web application and mobile app for real-time music and picture editing and sharing, named "StopEmotion".

Partial bibliography

Essays
 Serafino Murri, Pier Paolo Pasolini,  Editrice Il Castoro, Milan, 1994
 Serafino Murri, Krzysztof Kieslowski, Editrice Il Castoro, Milan, 1996
 Serafino Murri, Martin Scorsese, Editrice il Castoro, Milan, 2000
 Serafino Murri, Pier Paolo Pasolini: Salò o le 120 giornate di Sodoma,  Lindau, Turin, Universale Cinema, 2001

Literary works
 Invisibile a me stesso (Invisible to Myself, poem), Nuovi Argomenti, NS, n.20. October–December 2002), Milan, Mondadori
 Navarro Waltz, in AA. VV., La qualità dell'aria. Storie di questo tempo (eds. Nicola Lagioia, Christian Raimo), Rome, Minimum fax, 2004
 Attori (Actors, short novel), Nuovi Argomenti NS, n. 31, October–December 2005. Milan, Mondadori

Partial filmography
Film
 Movimenti (2004)
 The Changing of the Guard short film (2005)
 The Music Hall of Rome documentary (2007)
 Feisbum - Il film segments: "Angelo Azzurro Reloaded", "The Addiction"' (2009)
 Scandalo in sala. La sfida tra Potere e Cinema in Italia documentary (2014)

Television
 Nascita di un film (Birth of a Movie, documentary series, RaiSat Cinema, 2000)

External links
 
  Emoticron official website

References 

Italian screenwriters
Italian male screenwriters
Film directors from Rome
1966 births
Living people